Kongma Tse is a mountain in the Province No. 1, Nepal.

It was formerly called Mehra Peak, but, it was later renamed Kongma Tse to avoid confusion with Mera Peak. "Kongma Tse" means Snowcock, a bird native to Nepal.

Kongma Tse is situated above the Khumbu Glacier opposite Lobuche. Kongma Tse is twined with Pokalde.

References

External links 

 Kongma Tse at Nepal Himal Peak Profile

Mountains of Koshi Province
Five-thousanders of the Himalayas